The Schenk's Mill Covered Bridge or Shenk's Mill Covered Bridge is a covered bridge that spans the Big Chiques Creek in Lancaster County, Pennsylvania, United States. A county-owned and maintained bridge, its official designation is the Big Chiques #4 Bridge. (Chiques Creek was known as Chickies Creek until 2002).

The bridge has a single span, wooden, double Burr arch trusses design with the addition of steel hanger rods. The deck is made from oak planks.  It is painted red, the traditional color of Lancaster County covered bridges, on both the inside and outside. Both approaches to the bridge are painted in the traditional white color. It is one of only 3 covered bridges in the county with horizontal side boards.

On December 31, 2017, a truck driver from Arizona damaged the bridge while attempting to cross it, claiming to be lost on the way to Baltimore and following his GPS.

The bridge's WGCB Number is 38-36-30. Added in 1980, it is listed on the National Register of Historic Places as structure number 80003531.  It is located at  (40.1160, -76.4253).

History
The bridge was built in 1847 by Charles Malhorn and Levi Fink. The bridge was rebuilt in 1855.

Dimensions
Length: 80 feet (24.4 m) span and  total length
Width:  clear deck and  total width
Overhead clearance: 
Underclearance:

Gallery

See also
Burr arch truss
List of Lancaster County covered bridges

References

External links

Covered bridges in Lancaster County, Pennsylvania
Bridges completed in 1855
Covered bridges on the National Register of Historic Places in Pennsylvania
National Register of Historic Places in Lancaster County, Pennsylvania
Road bridges on the National Register of Historic Places in Pennsylvania
Wooden bridges in Pennsylvania
Burr Truss bridges in the United States